Semiramis of the North is a designation given to some particularly capable female monarchs, after the legendary princess Semiramis of Assyria.

Queens called by this name include:
 Margaret I of Denmark (1353–1412)
 Christina of Sweden (1626–1689)
 Catherine II of Russia (1729–1796)

References

Monarchy